The Čengić family was a noble Ottoman Bosnian family of Turkoman origin that produced several notable lords in the Bosnia Eyalet of the Ottoman Empire.

Origins 

The family is of ethnic Turkoman background and originates from Eğil, in present-day Turkey. Their paternal ancestor is İsfendiyar Bey who was a free vassal of Aq Quyunlu's Abul-Muzaffar. In 1498, Abul-Muzaffar freed İsfendiyar Bey's Eğil from paying taxes. In 1518 Selim I of the Ottomans conquered the Aq Qoyunlu's territory, including Eğil and expelled all the noble families, including İsfendiyar Bey who moved to Çankırı near Ankara, where he received a ziamet. Between 1498 and 1637 there are no records of his family. The oral tradition states that a descendant of İsfendiyar Bey, Kara Osman, arrived to Bosnia Eyalet in the 16th century. They were known after his hometown of Çankırı, first as Čangrlić and then Čengić. Kara Osman received a ziamet in the Borje, Foča. The oldest written record of the family comes from Evliya Çelebi who between 1664 and 1665 mentions a graveyard in Zagorje where ancestors of Ali Pasha Čengić were buried.

Notable members include:

 Ali Pasha Čengić ( 1840), military commander
 Bećir Pasha Čengić ( 1737), military commander
 Ded Agha Čengić (1823–1874), military commander, son of Smail-aga
 Džafer Pasha Čengić ( 1777), lord
 Smail Agha Čengić (1780–1840), lord (agha and mütesellim) and military commander, son of Ibrahim
 Zulfikar Pasha Čengić (died 1846), military commander

Footnotese

References

Books

Journals 

 

Ottoman Bosnian nobility
Families from the Ottoman Empire
Bosnia and Herzegovina families
Isfendiyarids